Zizeeria karsandra, the dark grass blue, is a small butterfly first described by Frederic Moore in 1865. It is found from the southern Mediterranean, in a broad band to India, Sri Lanka, the Andaman and Nicobar islands, Myanmar, Thailand, Malaysia, Yunnan, Indonesia, the Philippines, Arabia, United Arab Emirates, Saudi Arabia and Oman, New Guinea and northern and eastern Australia. It belongs to the lycaenids or blues family, and the tribe Polyommatini.

Description
Frederic Moore described this species on 1865 as: "Upperside purple-brown. Underside greyish brown, exterior margins defined by a brown line: fore wing with a spot within discoidal cell, a discocellular streak, a spot above it, and a transverse discal series of six spots black, each encircled with white; a marginal and submarginal row of pale brown, white-bordered lunules: hind wing with a series of twelve black spots, and a pale discocellular streak, encircled with white; a marginal row of pale brown, whitish-encircled spots, and a submarginal row of whitish lunules: cilia greyish brown."

Food plants
The recorded food plants include:
 Zornia diphylla
 Amaranthus viridis (in association with the ant Tapinoma melanocephalum)
 Amaranthus tricolor
 Amaranthus viridis
 Melilotus indica
 Medicago sativa
 Zornia diphylla
 Trifolium alexandrinum
 Glinus lotoides
 Tribulus cistoides
 Tribulus terrestris

Gallery

See also

 List of butterflies of India (Lycaenidae)

References

Polyommatini
Butterflies of Asia
Butterflies of Oceania
Butterflies of Australia
Butterflies of Indochina
Butterflies of Indonesia
Butterflies of Malaysia
Lepidoptera of New Guinea
Lepidoptera of the Philippines
Lepidoptera of Thailand
Insects of the Middle East
Insects of Myanmar
Butterflies described in 1865
Taxa named by Frederic Moore